The Theory of Evolution is a book by English evolutionary biologist and geneticist John Maynard Smith, originally published in 1958 in time for 150th anniversary of the birth of Charles Darwin and the centenary of the publication of The Origin of Species the following year. It serves as a general introduction to the eponymous subject, intended to be accessible to those with little technical knowledge of the area. It has been highly successful, considered by many as the definitive publication of its type. The original version was updated several times, and a Canto edition, with a foreword by Richard Dawkins, and newly written introduction by the author, was published in 1996.

Notes and references

1958 non-fiction books
Books about evolution
1958 in biology